Rosenbergia breuningi is a species of beetle in the family Cerambycidae. It was described by Rigout in 1982.

References

Batocerini
Beetles described in 1982